Polycestis is a genus of "jewel beetles" in the subfamily Polycestinae, containing the following species:

 Polycestis foveicollis Fairmaire, 1899
 Polycestis hauseri Obenberger, 1934
 Polycestis johanidesi Bily, 1997
 Polycestis rhois Marseul, 1865
 Polycestis strandi Obenberger, 1934

References

Buprestidae genera